Andre Devalle  Turner (born March 13, 1964) is an American former  professional basketball player who played in the National Basketball Association (NBA). He is currently the head coach for Lane College. A 5'11",  point guard, he played collegiately at Memphis State University (now the University of Memphis). Born in Memphis, Tennessee, his nickname in college was the "Little General".

College career
The shining moment of Andre Turner's career was in his junior season, when he, along with teammates Keith Lee, Baskerville Holmes, and William Bedford made it to the Final Four, on the strength of three consecutive game winning shots by Turner.
  
The first was in an overtime win against UAB.  Ironically, Gene Bartow was UAB's head coach, the last coach to lead Memphis State to the Final Four, eventually losing in the 1973 championship game against UCLA.

The second game winner came against Boston College, and the third, coming against the University of Oklahoma, propelled the Tigers back to the Final Four, only to lose to eventual champ Villanova, one of three Big East teams in the Final Four that year.

College statistics

|-
| align="left" | 1982–83
| align="left" | Memphis
| 31 || - || 32.5 || .518 || - || .806 || 1.1 || 4.1 || 2.4 || 0.1 || 9.9
|-
| align="left" | 1983–84
| align="left" | Memphis
| 33 || - || 31.9 || .457 || - || .667 || 1.4 || 4.5 || 1.8 || 0.1 || 8.2
|-
| align="left" | 1984–85
| align="left" | Memphis
| 34 || - || 34.0 || .498 || - || .714 || 2.3 || 6.6 || 1.6 || 0.1 || 11.4
|-
| align="left" | 1985–86
| align="left" | Memphis
| 34 || - || 33.4 || .478 || - || .854 || 2.0 || 7.7 || 2.6 || 0.1 || 13.9
|- class="sortbottom"
| style="text-align:center;" colspan="2"| Career
| 132 || - || 33.0 || .487 || - || .757 || 1.7 || 5.8 || 2.1 || 0.1 || 10.9
|}

Professional career
Turner was selected in the third round of the 1986 NBA Draft by the Los Angeles Lakers, but traded to the Boston Celtics. He played for seven teams in the NBA: the Boston Celtics, Houston Rockets, Milwaukee Bucks, Los Angeles Clippers, Charlotte Hornets, Philadelphia 76ers, and Washington Bullets. In 170 games with these seven teams, he holds career averages of 4.1 points, 1.5 rebounds, and 1.5 assists per game. His most productive year was in 1990–91, when he averaged 5.9 points and 4.4 assists in 70 games for the Philadelphia 76ers. Turner also played in the Continental Basketball Association for the La Crosse Catbirds, where he led the  team to the 1989–1990 CBA Championship, and in the World Basketball League for the Memphis Rockers.

After leaving the NBA, he played professionally in Spain. In 1997, Turner won the Spanish King's Cup MVP Award. He played for Joventut Badalona.

NBA career statistics

Regular season

|-
| align="left" | 1986–87
| align="left" | Boston
| 3 || 0 || 6.0 || .400 || .000 || .000 || 0.7 || 0.3 || 0.0 || 0.0 || 1.3
|-
| align="left" | 1987–88
| align="left" | Houston
| 12 || 0 || 8.3 || .353 || .143 || .714 || 0.7 || 1.9 || 0.6 || 0.1 || 2.9
|-
| align="left" | 1988–89
| align="left" | Milwaukee
| 4 || 0 || 3.3 || .500 || .000 || .000 || 0.8 || 0.0 || 0.5 || 0.0 || 1.5
|-
| align="left" | 1989–90
| align="left" | Los Angeles
| 3 || 0 || 10.3 || .154 || .000 || .000 || 1.7 || 1.0 || 0.3 || 0.0 || 1.3
|-
| align="left" | 1989–90
| align="left" | Charlotte
| 8 || 0 || 10.5 || .360 || .000 || 1.000 || 0.4 || 2.5 || 0.9 || 0.0 || 2.8
|-
| align="left" | 1990–91
| align="left" | Philadelphia
| 70 || 1 || 20.1 || .439 || .364 || .736 || 2.2 || 4.4 || 0.9 || 0.0 || 5.9
|-
| align="left" | 1991–92
| align="left" | Washington
| 70 || 3 || 12.4 || .425 || .063 || .792 || 1.3 || 2.5 || 0.8 || 0.0 || 4.1
|- class="sortbottom"
| style="text-align:center;" colspan="2"| Career
| 170 || 4 || 14.8 || .422 || .237 || .764 || 1.5 || 3.1 || 0.8 || 0.0 || 4.5
|}

Playoffs

|-
| align="left" | 1990–91
| align="left" | Philadelphia
| 8 || 0 || 23.6 || .438 || .333 || .813 || 1.6 || 4.4 || 1.4 || 0.0 || 7.3
|}

Coaching career
Turner was an assistant basketball coach at Mitchell High in Memphis for four years before being named head coach in 2015. The school,won three state championships during his time there, in 2014, 2015 and 2016.

On April 15, 2021, Turner was named head coach for Division II Lane College of the Southern Intercollegiate Athletic Conference (SIAC).

References

External links
College & NBA stats @ basketballreference.com
FIBA player profile
Andre Turner article @ solobasket.com 

1964 births
Living people
African-American basketball players
American expatriate basketball people in Canada
American expatriate basketball people in Spain
American men's basketball players
Basketball players from Memphis, Tennessee
Basket Zaragoza players
Boston Celtics players
CB Murcia players
CB Valladolid players
Charlotte Hornets players
College men's basketball head coaches in the United States
High school basketball coaches in Tennessee
Houston Rockets players
Joventut Badalona players
La Crosse Catbirds players
Lane Dragons men's basketball coaches
Liga ACB players
Los Angeles Clippers players
Los Angeles Lakers draft picks
Melilla Baloncesto players
Memphis Tigers men's basketball players
Menorca Bàsquet players
Miami Heat expansion draft picks
Milwaukee Bucks players
Philadelphia 76ers players
Point guards
Real Betis Baloncesto players
Rockford Lightning players
Sportspeople from Memphis, Tennessee
Washington Bullets players
21st-century African-American people
20th-century African-American sportspeople